Towyn is a seaside resort in the Conwy County Borough, Wales. It is also an electoral ward to the town and county councils.

Location
It is located between Rhyl, in Denbighshire, and Abergele in Conwy.

Demography
According to the 2001 Census, together with neighbouring Kinmel Bay (to the east), it had a population 7,864, of which 10.7% could speak Welsh. Only a third of the population were born in Wales. Towyn itself had a population of 2,380 in the 2011 census.

1990 tidal floods
The town made national headlines in 1990 when a combination of gale-force winds, a high tide and rough seas caused Towyn's flood defences to be breached at about 11.00am on 26 February.  of land was flooded, affecting 2,800 properties and causing areas of the resort to be evacuated. Further flooding occurred later the same week, on 1 March, shortly after the site of the disaster was visited by Prince Charles and Princess Diana. Scientific experts also believe that the silt left behind from the flooding had left the town with a higher concentration of radioactivity, over ten times the governmental safety limits, most likely originating from the nuclear processing plant at Sellafield which had been dispersed into the Irish Sea over many years since its construction. The National Radiological Protection Board stated that there was a "small risk" to the people there, while the Welsh Office claimed there was no danger to the public. The coastal defences have since been reconstructed and significantly enhanced.

Architecture
St. Mary's Church was designed by the renowned architect George Edmund Street, and was consecrated on 17 June 1873. It is known for the distinctive tiling on the roof. The same architect also designed the building which now houses the youth club in nearby Abergele.

Economy
The principal economic activity in Towyn is tourism, concentrated in the summer season. A mix of static caravans and touring caravan pitches provides accommodation.

Governance
Towyn is also the name of an electoral ward which comprises the western half of the community of Kinmel Bay and Towyn. It elects a county councillor to Conwy County Borough Council. It was represented by the Labour Party until June 2004, when the Conservative Party won the seat. At the May 2017 election the ward was won by an Independent councillor.

Towyn is also a community ward, electing town councillors to represent it on Towyn and Kinmel Bay Town Council.

References

External links 

www.geograph.co.uk: photos of Towyn and surrounding area

Kinmel Bay and Towyn
Towns in Conwy County Borough
Seaside resorts in Wales
Wards of Conwy County Borough